A  is a type of karaoke establishment commonly found in East Asia, Southeast Asia, South Asia, the United States and Canada. It originated in Japan, and is now popular worldwide, particularly in Asia. Karaoke boxes consist of multiple rooms containing karaoke equipment, usually rented out for a period of time. A typical karaoke box establishment contains 10–20 (or more) such rooms, that can be themed so that each room has a different feeling or can be a traditional karaoke box, as well as have a main karaoke bar area in the front. Karaoke box establishments often sell beverages, and sometimes food but sometimes the establishment offers free refreshments. Many people of all ages enjoy karaoke as a pastime in Japan, as it still has a huge influence in the Japanese music scene and it is also a place that can attract tourists as well. One blogger, who is a fan of karaoke, writes "...to sing karaoke is to embrace the moment that your love of song transcends your love of self." While people do go to and enjoy karaoke boxes with family and friends, people also go by themselves and are able to enjoy the comfort of performing in the room by themselves. There is also a different style of karaoke, the traditional type where the patrons sing in front of everyone that is also still offered in popular entertainment areas, rather than the private boxes.  

A new trend of karaoke booth have shown up in Chinese shopping malls where customers can enter a booth, similar to a photo-booth, that allows them to perform different songs. The booths are cheaper than the traditional karaoke box, as they do not have to rent a room but just go in and sing a number of songs. The booths are very similar to the karaoke boxes but on a more intimate scale, with at least 20,000 booths running with an estimated 3.18 billion yuan in the 2017. The booths have an air conditioner, seats for the customers, the karaoke equipment, and headsets. 

Another trend that has popped up recently, as Itochu Corp., which has its usually services in karaoke boxes has recently began offering their boxes for daytime meetings for business who need a cheap business room, as their starting price start at about $10.00 an hour.

There has also been conversation about fire safety with karaoke boxes after an arson in Hong Kong which led to public concern about their safety. There has been research where they recreated an establishment with 3 boxes and a corridor, in a remote location in China, which was designed with the intention of testing a real-time fire in a karaoke establishment. There has also been additional research about karaoke boxes as to ensure the safety of the customers in evacuation research about widening the length of hallways.

The term karaoke box is primarily used in Japan, Hong Kong and Macau. Karaoke box establishments are commonly known as KTV (an abbreviation of karaoke television) in Taiwan, China, Cambodia, Myanmar, Singapore, the United States and Canada, videoke in the Philippines, noraebang (노래방) in South Korea (literally meaning singing room), hwamyŏn panju ŭmaksil (화면반주음악실) in North Korea, karaoke room in Vietnam, and karaoke club in Sri Lanka. It is also common to simply abbreviate it as K in Hong Kong Cantonese, often when used as a verb, for example 去K歌 (to go K songs) or 去唱K (to go sing K).

Legal issues
KTV can also refer to a karaoke music video, a music video with karaoke lyrics and MMO audio track. Some karaoke music videos were sold to KTV establishments under exclusivity contracts, making some people use them to copy karaoke music videos illegally and share them on the Internet. These are often found on the Internet in MPEG (VCD) or VOB (DVD) format with (KTV) appended to the filename.

References

External links

At the Mic: Karaoke Television, by Mia Dick, Compass Magazine, April–May 1998, retrieved 5 November 2006.
Karaoke Players Info: More about the usage of karaoke around the world.

Karaoke
Japanese popular culture
Cambodian culture
Chinese culture
Cantonese culture
Culture of Hong Kong
Culture of Macau
Singaporean culture
Malaysian culture
Indonesian culture
Philippine popular culture
South Korean popular culture
Sri Lankan culture
Taiwanese culture
Thai culture
Vietnamese culture